The Essential Johnny Cash 1955–1983 is a three-disc compilation album containing Johnny Cash's material from 1955-1983.

Track listing

Certifications

References

1992 compilation albums
Johnny Cash compilation albums